Vromance (stylized in all caps), is a South Korean vocal group formed by RBW in 2016. The group debuted in July 2016 with their extended play The Action.

Career

Pre-debut
Prior to their debut, the four members worked as vocal trainers for Korean pop idols and recorded guide songs for singers. In August 2011, the group's leader Park Jang-hyun was a contestant on the singing contest Superstar K3, but later was eliminated. The following year, he signed with RBW (that time WA Entertainment).
Park Jang-hyun and fellow members Park Hyun-kyu recorded "Love Is..." for the soundtrack of the 2013 SBS drama The Heirs.  In 2014 Park Hyun-kyu was featured on "Goodbye Rain" by Jeon Min-ju and Euna Kim, future members of The Ark and Khan.  In February 2016, Park Jang-hyun collaborated with Huh Gak for the song "Already Winter". In June 2016, RBW announced that would debuted the four members vocal group, VROMANCE.

2016–2017: Debut with The Action, Romance and Mix Nine
The group debuted on July 12, 2016, with the release of their first EP The Action and its title track "She", which they described as swing-inspired and funky.

Vromance released their first digital single "Fishery Management" on September 14, 2016, which was described as medium-tempo song with bright rhythmical guitar and brilliant chorus.

Vromance released their second EP Romance on January 6, 2017, with the title track "I'm Fine", which has been described as heartwarming and traditional. They also held a comeback show one day before the release of their EP.

Vromance released their second digital single "Wake Me Up" on March 14, 2017.

In October 2017, Park Hyun-kyu and Lee Chan-dong participated in YG Entertainment reality survival show Mix Nine and were pitted against other trainees from another company to secure a spot in YGE's new project group. However, they were eliminated in episode 10.

2018–present: New digital singles

On January 17, 2018, Vromance released their fifth studio single "Flower" produced by Jungkey. There were little to no promotions for this particular single.

One month later on February 21, 2018, they followed up with their sixth single "Star" which also underwent little to no promotions.

On April 6, 2018, Vromance released their seventh single "Oh My Season" which they promoted on several music shows.

On May 25, 2018, they released an OST for the Korean adaption of the American television show Suits entitled "Now".

On August 3, 2018, Vromance released their seventh single overall and final single of 2018  called "Basic Instinct" which did not receive a music video or promotions at all.

On March 1, 2019, they released their eighth single "Unlike" with little to no promotions.

On June 26, 2019, it was announced by RBW that Vromance would be returning with a comeback entitled "You can lean on me". The single was released on June 27, 2019, with all four members participating on the track despite Hyun-gyu's enlistment earlier in the month of June.

On December 15, 2019, they released the song "The Cure". All four members participated on the song, despite the enlistments of Jang-hyun, Hyun-gyu and Chan-dong. Various live performances of the song were subsequently released.

On June 22, 2020, Vromance released the song "Always You", with all members participating despite enlistments once again. A lyric video was released two days later.

On May 31, 2021, Vromance released the song "The Moment".

On October 5, 2021, it was announced that Lee Chan-dong has changed his name to Yoon Eun-o, and that he will be using his new name in future activities.

Personal
In 2019, Jang-hyun was enlisted in supplemental service as a public duty personnel on April 26. The same year, Hyun-gyu was enlisted in active duty as a police officer on June 13, discharged on January 7, 2021. And Chan-dong was enlisted in active duty on August 5 to the Goseong 22nd Division, discharged on February 25, 2021. On June 17, 2020, Hyun-seok was enlisted in active duty.

On July 17, 2020, Jang-hyun posted a handwritten letter on Vromance's fancafe, announcing his marriage with a non-celebrity in August. The couple held a ceremony on March 21, 2021.

Members
 Park Jang-hyun — Leader
 Park Hyun-kyu 
 Yoon Eun-o
 Lee Hyun-seok

Discography

Extended plays

Singles

Collaboration

Soundtrack appearances

Filmography

Television shows

Musical

Notes

References 

K-pop music groups
Musical groups established in 2016
South Korean boy bands
2016 establishments in South Korea
Vocal quartets